K9 World Cup (Spanish: Selección Canina) is a Mexican CGI sports comedy film, produced by Vero Arceo and Ricardo Arnaiz and directed by Nathan Sifuentes and Carlos Pimentel. The film is produced by Animex Producciones (under its Nahuala Films label), Imagination Films, and Clustertim.

The film features a large ensemble voice cast of Mexican actors led by Fernando Luján, Plutarco Haza, Raúl Araiza, Maite Perroni, Pierre Angelo, Sergio Corona, Manuel "Loco" Valdés and Gaspar Henaine "Capulina", with Mexican soccer players, Jorge Campos, Alberto García Aspe, Luis Roberto "Alves" Zague, Germán Villa, and Mexican sport journalists José Ramón Fernández, Enrique "El perro" Bermúdez and Cristian Martinoli as soccer commentators. The film's title is a reference to Mexico national football team, known as "Selección mexicana". 

The film is distributed by Gussi Films. The film had its world premiere at the 22nd San Diego Latino Film Festival in San Diego, United States on 18 March 2015.

The film was released on 24 April 2015.

The English dub features the voices of Sean Astin, Ignacio Sandoval, Sandra Peña and Maurice LaMarche.

Plot
After another failure that puts their classification at the CONCACAN Tournament at risk, the Mexicanine Team changes its coach. The chosen to take the helm of the team is the veteran Bernardo "Profe" Lapata, one of the star players who many years ago almost led to the triumph of the National Team in its best tournament in history, along with two great teammates: Cañón Colmillo and Lobo Perreda.

Lapata decides to summon new blood to the National Team and thus he meets by accident with Polo and Juancho, two great amateurs strikers, bound by something more than football/soccer. The great talent of Polo and Juancho will lead the National Team to the Grand Final of the Canine Cup, but both will have to overcome their great egos and personalism to learn to play as a team and thus achieve the much desired Cup.

Release
The film's teaser was released on 24 July 2014.

Production
The original idea comes from Carlos Pimentel who began working with Arnaiz in the story since July 2009.

References

External links
Official website

Mexican animated films
2015 films
Mexican children's films
2010s Mexican films